Michael Salzhauer (born 1972) is an American celebrity doctor who practices plastic surgery.  He is active on social media as  Dr. Miami, has been on reality TV, has recorded a song, and written a children's book. He runs a plastic surgery practice in Bay Harbor Islands, Florida.

Early life and education
At the outbreak of World War I, Salzhauer's grandfather's family fled Ukraine and pogroms there; his great-grandfather was clubbed to death by a Cossack as the family left.  The rest of the family moved first to Vienna and then Berlin. When the Nazis came to power, his grandfather moved to Israel, and Salzhauer's father was born in Tel Aviv. His father moved to New York City in 1958, where Salzhauer was born in 1972 and grew up.

While the rest of his family had attended Jewish schools, Salzhauer wanted to go to public high school to compete on the swim team.  He was teased over the shape of his nose, and he left and went to the Frisch School, a Jewish high school. He then attended Rockland Community College from 1989 to 1990 before transferring into Brooklyn College's BA/MD program. There, he met his wife, Eva. After two years he transferred to Washington University School of Medicine in St. Louis, Missouri.  After graduating he did his residency at first at Mount Sinai in Miami in general surgery, then at Jackson Memorial Hospital in Miami for plastic surgery, then did further training in plastic surgery at Cleveland Clinic in Weston, Florida.  The other residents performed a rhinoplasty on Salzhauer as a gift for the completion of his residency.  They also gave him a chin implant and liposuction.

Career
In 2003, Salzhauer opened his own practice in Bal Harbour, Florida, and six years later moved to a new five story building there.  He told a reporter for Miami New Times in 2012, that "Marketing makes the world go 'round" and that he had courted the publicity of controversy.

Salzhauer authored a children's book in 2008 titled My Beautiful Mommy, which focused on a young girl whose mother undergoes a tummy tuck, a nose job, and breast augmentation. It was illustrated by Victor Guiza. Salzhauer and the book were criticized for promoting elective cosmetic surgery and for a line that suggests that mommy's new nose will "be prettier." Child psychologist Elizabeth Berger has noted that while an explanatory book will be helpful for children, it "can be difficult for small kids to understand". Salzhauer defended the book, saying that he wrote it to help parents explain such surgeries to their children.

In 2009, Salzhauer published a virtual plastic surgery iPhone application that allowed users to tweak photographs of themselves to simulate operations. The New York Times commented that the results were "worthy of a fun-house mirror".

In 2012, he caused controversy within the Orthodox Jewish community after producing a video titled "Jewcan Sam" with the Jewish punk band The Groggers. The video features a young Jewish man who undergoes rhinoplasty at the request of his girlfriend. The American Society of Plastic Surgeons initiated an ethics investigation as a result, and both Salzhauer and the band were accused of playing into Jewish stereotypes.

Salzhauer is also active on social media posting under his nickname "Dr. Miami." Apart from using Instagram and Twitter, the surgeon is also active on Snapchat's story mode, where he posts videos of cosmetic surgeries. As of 2016, he had around a million followers on Snapchat.

In January 2016, Salzhauer was nominated for the eighth annual Shorty Award in the Snapchatter of the year category. He came in second place, losing to DJ Khaled.

In July 2016, WE tv announced a reality television series, Dr. Miami, starring Salzhauer. The series premiered on March 31, 2017 and ran for 6 episodes on WE tv.

In 2017, Salzhauer and recording artist Adam Barta released a song called "Flawless". The song reached #24 on the Billboard dance/electronic digital chart, #9 on iTunes dance singles chart, and #32 on the Billboard hot club dance chart.

In 2020, Salzhauer's documentary, They Call Me Dr. Miami, directed by Jean-Simon Chartier, was released on Discovery+.

See also
Maggie Goes on a Diet

References

External links
Bal Harbour Plastic Surgery Associates
Michael Salzhauer, AKA Dr. Miami, Discusses His Plastic Surgery Snapchat Videos And Brand (interview) Forbes.com

American plastic surgeons
1972 births
Living people
Celebrity doctors
American people of Ukrainian-Jewish descent
Brooklyn College alumni
Frisch School alumni